Mirandés may refer to:

 Mirandese language, a language spoken in a small area of northeastern Portugal.
 The CD Mirandés, a Spanish football team.
 The citizens of Miranda de Ebro, a town in Spain.